Lee Wan-chen (born 22 November 1997), known as Isabella Lee, is a Taiwanese footballer who plays as a defender for Taiwan Mulan Football League club Kaohsiung Sunny Bank and the Chinese Taipei women's national team.

References

1997 births
Living people
Women's association football defenders
Taiwanese women's footballers
Footballers from Kaohsiung
Chinese Taipei women's international footballers
IMG Academy alumni
UC Riverside Highlanders women's soccer players
Taiwanese expatriate footballers
Taiwanese expatriate sportspeople in the United States
Expatriate women's soccer players in the United States